The Yarra pygmy perch (Nannoperca obscura) is a species of temperate perch endemic to Australia. It occurs in the coastal drainages of southeastern Australia, preferring streams and lakes with plentiful vegetation and flowing water. It feeds on small insects and their larvae, as well as small crustaceans. Yarra pygmy perch are olive-green above, greenish-brown on the sides, and yellowish-white below, with chevron-shaped markings on rear half of the body. It can also be found in the aquarium trade.

References

Nannoperca
Freshwater fish of Australia
Fish described in 1872
Taxonomy articles created by Polbot